Full Moon Records was an American record label existing from 1974 to 1992. Prominent signed acts included Chicago, Joe Walsh and Dan Fogelberg.

Beginning in 1974 with Fogelberg, Full Moon Records was originally a subsidiary "spin-off" label from Epic Records that was created by Irving Azoff. The first album to be released under the label was Fogelberg's second album, Souvenirs. In 1980, distribution moved from CBS to Warner Bros. (movie soundtracks included). Some of the artists affected by the acquisition were Chicago, Grand Funk Railroad, and Johnny Lee. The company was absorbed by Warner Bros. in 1992.  The only exception was Fogelberg, whose Full Moon recordings bore the Full Moon logo and were distributed by Epic throughout. The label was briefly revived in 2009 for the release of Fogelberg's final studio album Love in Time, with distribution thru Universal Music Enterprises.

See also
 List of record labels

External links
 Full Moon Album Discography

 
Record labels established in 1974
Record labels disestablished in 1992
Defunct record labels of the United States
Rock record labels
Warner Music labels
American companies established in 1974
American companies disestablished in 1992